The Maldives Davis Cup team represents Maldives in Davis Cup tennis competition and are governed by the Tennis Association of Maldives. They currently compete in the Asia/Oceania Zone of Group IV.

History
Maldives competed in its first Davis Cup in 2022.

Players

Recent performances
Here is the list of all match-ups of Maldives participation in the Davis Cup in 2022.

See also
Davis Cup

References

External links

Davis Cup teams
Davis Cup
Davis Cup